Neha Goyal (born 15 November 1996) is an Indian field hockey player and is a member of the India national team. She hails from Haryana and plays as the midfielder.

Early life
Goyal was born in Sonipat in Haryana. She comes from a poor family and has two elder sisters. Her father was a alcohol addict and her mother as a daily wage worker in a cycle factory earning ₹2000/month making spoke. She and her family have struggled to take care of her basic requirements like shoes, hockey sticks, diet regime, etc.

Goyal started playing hockey when she was 11.

Goyal began training in an academy run by former India captain Pritam Rani Siwach. Goyal completed her schooling from Tika Ram Senior Secondary Girls School.

Career
Goyal made her debut in the senior Indian national team in 2014 and played her first match in Glasgow during the FIH Champions Challenge.

Goyal was part of the 18-member Indian team for the 2018 World Cup in London. In their opening match, India played against the host England, where Goyal gave India the lead in 25th minute before England equalised it and the match ended in a draw.

References

External links

Neha Goyal at Hockey India

Living people
1996 births
People from Sonipat
Sportswomen from Haryana
Field hockey players from Haryana
Indian female field hockey players
Female field hockey midfielders
Field hockey players at the 2018 Asian Games
Asian Games silver medalists for India
Asian Games medalists in field hockey
Medalists at the 2018 Asian Games
Field hockey players at the 2020 Summer Olympics
Olympic field hockey players of India
South Asian Games gold medalists for India
South Asian Games medalists in field hockey
Field hockey players at the 2022 Commonwealth Games
Commonwealth Games bronze medallists for India
Commonwealth Games medallists in field hockey
Medallists at the 2022 Commonwealth Games